The early Earth is loosely defined as Earth in its first one billion years, or gigayear (Ga, 109y). The “early Earth” encompasses approximately the first gigayear in the evolution of our planet, from its initial formation in the young Solar System at about 4.55 Ga to sometime in the Archean eon at about 3.5 Ga. On the geologic time scale, this comprises all of the Hadean eon (starting with the formation of the Earth about 4.6 billion years ago), as well as the Eoarchean (starting 4 billion years ago) and part of the Paleoarchean (starting 3.6 billion years ago) eras of the Archean eon.

This period of Earth's history involved the planet's formation from the solar nebula via a process known as accretion. This time period included intense meteorite bombardment as well as giant impacts, including the Moon-forming impact, which resulted in a series of magma oceans and episodes of core formation. After formation of the core, delivery of meteoritic or cometary material in a "late veneer" may have delivered water and other volatile compounds to the Earth. Although little crustal material from this period survives, the oldest dated specimen is a zircon mineral of 4.404 ± 0.008 Ga enclosed in a metamorphosed sandstone conglomerate in the Jack Hills of the Narryer Gneiss Terrane of Western Australia. The earliest supracrustals (such as the Isua greenstone belt) date from the latter half of this period, about 3.8 gya, around the same time as peak Late Heavy Bombardment.

History

According to evidence from radiometric dating and other sources, Earth formed about 4.54 billion years ago. Within its first billion years, life appeared in its oceans and began to affect its atmosphere and surface, promoting the proliferation of aerobic as well as anaerobic organisms. Since then, the combination of Earth's distance from the Sun, its physical properties and its geological history have allowed life to emerge, develop photosynthesis, and, later, evolve further and thrive. The earliest life on Earth arose at least 3.5 billion years ago. Earlier possible evidence of life includes graphite, which may have a biogenic origin, in 3.7-billion-year-old metasedimentary rocks discovered in southwestern Greenland and 4.1-billion-year-old zircon grains in Western Australia.

In November 2020, an international team of scientists reported studies suggesting that the primeval atmosphere of the early Earth was very different from the conditions used in the Miller–Urey studies considering the origin of life on Earth.

See also

References

External links
 Earth – Speed through space – about 1 million miles an hour – NASA and (WP discussion)

zh-yue:早期地球
Geologic time scales of Earth